Mid-American Energy Building is a high-rise office building located in the downtown Davenport, Iowa.  The building was designed by Shive-Hattery Engineers & Architects and built by Iowa-Illinois Gas and Electric Company in 1995.  It is a 9-story office building that stands on top of a six-story parking ramp.  The building stands , and is the second tallest building in the city after the Wells Fargo Bank Building.   The building is also the home to a couple of peregrine falcons.

The building is connected by way of skywalks to the RiverCenter and the Radisson Hotel.

References

Office buildings completed in 1995
Skyscrapers in Iowa
Skyscraper office buildings in Iowa
Buildings and structures in Davenport, Iowa
Modernist architecture in Iowa
1995 establishments in Iowa